The province of Monza and Brianza is an administrative province of Lombardy region, Italy.

Description
It was officially created by splitting the north-eastern part from the province of Milan on 12 May 2004, and became executive after the provincial elections of 6 and 7 June 2009. The province had a population of 871,735 (2017) divided in 55 comunes. The capital and largest commune is Monza (population 123,776 as of 2017), only  from Milan. The other largest municipalities are Seregno, Desio, Limbiate, Lissone, Vimercate, Cesano Maderno  and Brugherio. It borders the provinces of Lecco and Como to the north, the province of Varese to the west, the province of Bergamo to the east and the Metropolitan City of Milan to the south-east.

Most populated settlements

The top ten municipalities in the province of Monza and Brianza sorted by number of inhabitants are:

Communes 
The 55 municipalities in the province are:

Government

List of presidents of the province of Monza and Brianza

Gallery

Notes

External links

 Official website

 
Monza
Monza and Brianza